Silvio David Zaninelli (December 9, 1913 – January 29, 1979) was an American football running back and fullback who played four seasons for the Pittsburgh Pirates of the National Football League (NFL). In his career, he scored one touchdown on 81 rushing attempts. He played a total of 44 games, being a starter in 25 of them. Zaninelli played college football at Duquesne.

References

1913 births
1979 deaths
Pittsburgh Steelers players
Players of American football from Pennsylvania
Sportspeople from Reading, Pennsylvania